Otterbein (also Otterbine) is an unincorporated community in southwestern Butler Township, Darke County, Ohio, United States. It lies at the intersection of Otterbin Ithaca and Preble County Butler Township Roads southwest of the city of Greenville, the county seat.  Its elevation is 1,109 feet (338 m).  Because the community has borne multiple names, the Board on Geographic Names officially designated it "Otterbein" in 1963.

References

Unincorporated communities in Darke County, Ohio
Unincorporated communities in Ohio